The Cierva CR Twin (originally designated CR LTH.1 and also known as the Grasshopper III) was a five-seat utility helicopter that first flew in the UK in 1969. It was a joint development between Cierva Autogiro Company and Rotorcraft now a subsidiary of Cierva, based on the dynamic systems of the latter company's Grasshopper design. A new, highly streamlined pod-and-boom fuselage was married to the Grasshopper's coaxial rotor system, and the new aircraft registered G-AWRP first flew on 18 August 1969.

Two further prototypes followed, G-AXFM later in 1969 and G-AZAU in 1971, this latter example fitted with 210 hp Continental IO-360-D engines in place of the Rolls-Royce Continental O-300 units of the first two machines. Financial backing could not be obtained for further development, and the project was abandoned by 1975. The first prototype is preserved at The Helicopter Museum in Weston-super-Mare.

Variants
 CR Twin - prototypes (3 built)
 CR.420 - proposed production variant with 210 hp Continental TSIO-360-A engines (not built)
 CR.640 - proposed production variant with 320 hp Continental Tiara T6-320 engines (not built)

Specifications

See also

References

Notes

Bibliography

 
 
 

1960s British civil utility aircraft
1960s British helicopters
Cancelled aircraft projects
CR Twin
Coaxial rotor helicopters
Aircraft first flown in 1969
Twin-engined piston helicopters